David Greig (born 1837 in Tillicoultry, Clackmannanshire, Scotland) was a wealthy gentleman farmer who lived near Stirling. He was educated at Dollar Academy and held lands in Stirlingshire and owned small areas of Stirling and Glasgow. After the collapse of the City of Glasgow Bank in 1878, much of the family's money was lost as shareholders had to pay for the crash, forced to pay 26 times the amount of money they had invested to cover the collapse.

People from Tillicoultry
1837 births
People educated at Dollar Academy
Year of death missing